The 2012 Quebec Scotties Tournament of Hearts was held from January 25 to 29 at the Club de Curling Kénogami in Jonquière, Quebec. The winning team of Marie-France Larouche, represented Quebec at the 2012 Scotties Tournament of Hearts in Red Deer, Alberta, where she finished round robin with a 7-4 record. This was enough to clinch a spot in the playoffs in the 3-4 game. Larouche and team would lose both the 3-4 game and the bronze medal game.

Format Changes

The 2011-12 season will see a new format for both the men and women's provincial playdowns. The women's tournament will now consist of eight teams playing in a triple knockout format, and a page playoff consisting of three teams. Four teams will qualify from the four Quebec regions, and four teams will qualify through the points system. This change means that the defending champions from the previous season will no longer receive a berth into the provincial playdowns and that two fewer teams will compete in the provincial playdowns.

Teams

Standings

Knockout results

A event

B event

C event

Playoffs

1 vs 2
January 28, 7:00 PM ET

Semifinal
January 29, 9:00 AM ET

Final
January 29, 2:00 PM ET

References

Quebec
Scotties Tournament of Hearts
Quebec Scotties Tournament of Hearts
Sport in Saguenay, Quebec